The city of Natchez, Mississippi, was founded in 1716 as Fort Rosalie, and renamed for the Natchez people in 1763.

Pre-European settlement (to 1716)

According to archaeological excavations, the area has been continuously inhabited by various cultures of indigenous peoples since the 8th century A.D. The original site of Natchez was developed as a major village with ceremonial platform mounds, built by people of the prehistoric Plaquemine culture, part of the influential Mississippian culture and active in this area from about 700 AD. Archaeological evidence shows they began construction of the three main earthwork mounds by 1200. Additional work was done in the mid-15th century.

By the late 17th and early 18th century, the Natchez (pronounced "Nochi"), descendants of the Plaquemine culture, occupied the site. They used it as their major ceremonial center, after leaving the area of Emerald Mound. They added to the mounds, including a residence for their chief, the "Great Sun", on Mound B, and a combined temple and charnel house for the elite on Mound C.

Many early European explorers, including Hernando de Soto, La Salle and Bienville, made contact with the Natchez at this site, called the Grand Village of the Natchez. Their accounts provided descriptions of the society and village.

The most thorough account was written by French colonists Antoine-Simon Le Page du Pratz, who lived near the Natchez for several years, learning their language and befriending leaders. He witnessed the 1725 funeral of the war chief, Tattooed Serpent (Serpent Piqué in French.) The Natchez maintained a hierarchical society, divided into nobles and commoners, with people affiliated according to matrilineal descent. The paramount chief, known as the "Great Sun", owed his position to the rank of his mother. His next eldest brother served as Tattooed Serpent.

The  site of the Grand Village of the Natchez is preserved as a National Historic Landmark; it is maintained by the Mississippi Department of Archives and History. The site includes a museum with artifacts from the mounds and village. A  picnic pavilion and walking trails are also available on the grounds. Nearby Emerald Mound is also a National Historic Landmark of the Natchez and their ancestors.

Colonial history (1716–1783)

In 1716 the French founded Fort Rosalie, to protect the trading post which had been established two years earlier in the Natchez territory. Permanent French settlements and plantations were subsequently developed a dangerous distance from the fort and too near important native locales. The French inhabitants of the "Natchez colony" often came into conflict with the Natchez people over land use and resources. This was one of several Natchez settlements; others lay to the northeast. The Natchez tended to become increasingly split into pro-French and pro-English factions; those who were more distant had more relations with English traders, who came to the area from British colonies to the east.

After several smaller wars, the Natchez (together with the Chickasaw and Yazoo) launched a war to eliminate the French in November 1729. It became known by the Europeans as the "Natchez War" or Natchez Rebellion. The Indians destroyed the French colony at Natchez and other settlements in the area. On November 29, 1729, the Natchez Indians killed a total of 229 French colonists: 138 men, 35 women, and 56 children (the largest death toll by an Indian attack in Mississippi's history). They took most of the women and children as captives. The French with their Indian allies attacked the Natchez repeatedly over the next two years, resulting in most of the Natchez Indians being killed, enslaved, or forced to flee as refugees. After surrender of the leader and several hundred Natchez in 1731, the French took their prisoners to New Orleans, where they were forcibly sold as slaves and shipped as laborers on the Caribbean plantations of Saint-Domingue, as ordered by the French prime minister Maurepas.

Many of the Natchez who escaped enslavement sought refuge with the Creek and Cherokee peoples, ultimately being absorbed into their people. Descendants of the Natchez diaspora have reorganized and survive as the Natchez Nation, a treaty tribe and confederate of the federally recognized Muscogee (Creek) Nation, with a sovereign traditional government.

Following the Seven Years' War, in 1763 Fort Rosalie and the surrounding town, renamed for the defeated tribe, came under British rule. The British Crown bestowed land grants in this territory to officers who had served with distinction in the war. These officers came mostly from the colonies of New York, New Jersey, and Pennsylvania. They established plantations and brought their upper class style of living to the area. Before 1774, Lord Dartmouth who was Secretary of State for the Colonies and the previous First Lord of Trade, contemplated siting a civil government below Natchez at White Cliffs which would be the residence of a Lieutenant Governor reporting to Pensacola. Montfort Browne visited Natchez in 1769 while he was Lieutenant Governor of West Florida; he received a grant near Natchez. Bernard Romans' map Proposals dated August 5, 1773 from Philadelphia to likely subscribers indicated a purpose was to map the Mississippi River from Natchez to the mouth. During the 1760s and 1770s, the merchants of Natchez handled the Indian trade for other merchants such as McGillivrary & Struthers of Mobile and others. On February 16, 1779, British authorities in London received several petitions from West Florida proprietors, merchants and settlers to grant local courts at Natchez, encourage commerce and make land grant reforms.

The Spanish commander, Juan de la Villebreuvre, on September 7, 1779 conquered Fort Bute, and later the garrison at Baton Rouge and Natchez's Fort Panmure to establish Spanish colonial rule, but a Natchez loyalist militia forced him to surrender Fort Panmure in May 1781. A few days later Pensacola was lost by the British and the Natchez revolt collapsed. After defeat in the American Revolutionary War, Great Britain ceded the territory to the United States under the terms of the Treaty of Paris (1783). Spain was not a party to the treaty, and it was their forces who had taken Natchez from British troops. Although Spain had been allied with the American colonists, they were more interested in advancing their power at the expense of Britain. Once the war was over, they were not inclined to give up that which they had acquired by force.

In 1797 Major Andrew Ellicott of the United States of America marched to the highest ridge in the young town of Natchez, set up camp, and raised the first American Flag claiming Natchez and all former Spanish lands east of the Mississippi above the 31st parallel for the United States.

A census of the Natchez District taken in 1784 counted 1,619 people, including 498 black slaves.

Antebellum (1783–1860)

In the late 18th century, Natchez was the starting point of the Natchez Trace overland route, a Native American trail that followed a path established by migrating animals, most likely buffalo, which ran from Natchez to Nashville through what are now Mississippi, Alabama, and Tennessee. Produce and goods were transported on the Mississippi River by the flatboatmen and keelboatmen, who usually sold their wares at Natchez or New Orleans, including their boats (as lumber). They made the long trek back north to their homes overland on the Natchez Trace. The boatmen were locally called "Kaintucks" because they were usually from Kentucky, although the entire Ohio River Valley was well-represented among their numbers. The Trace was traveled heavily until the development of steamboats in the 1820s allowed northward navigation (against the current) on the River.

By royal order the Roman Catholic church purchased 300 arpents square near the fort from Richard Carpenter on April 11, 1788.

On October 27, 1795, the U.S. and Spanish signed the Treaty of San Lorenzo, settling their decade-long boundary dispute. All Spanish claims to Natchez were formally surrendered to the United States. More than two years passed before official orders reached the Spanish garrison there. In early 1797, the Treasury Department sent $2,200 worth of supplies to Natchez through New Orleans merchant, Robert Cochran. Spanish authorities exercised strict regulations for commerce and the development of the streets, lots, and bluff, but surrendered the fort and possession of the Town of Natchez to United States forces led by Captain Isaac Guion on March 30, 1798.

A week later, Natchez became the first capital of the new Mississippi Territory, created by the Adams administration. On March 10, 1803 the territorial assembly incorporated the town. After it served for several years as the territorial capital, the territory built a new capital, named Washington,  to the east, also in Adams County. After roughly 15 years, the legislature transferred the capital back to Natchez at the end of 1817, when the territory was admitted as a state. Later the capital was returned to Washington. As the state's population center shifted to the north and east with more settlers entering the area, the legislature voted to move the capital to the more centrally located city of Jackson in 1822. In 1830 the population of Natchez was 2,789. Samuel Cotton, the Natchez harbor master reported collection from 383 steamships, 10 keelboats, and 868 flatboats for the year 1829.

Throughout the course of the early nineteenth century, Natchez was the center of economic activity for the young state. Its strategic location on the high bluffs on the eastern bank of the Mississippi River enabled it to develop into a bustling port. At Natchez, many local plantation owners had their cotton loaded onto steamboats at the landing known as Natchez Under-the-Hill to be transported downriver to New Orleans or, sometimes, upriver to St. Louis or Cincinnati. The cotton was sold and shipped to New England, New York, and European spinning and textile mills.

The Natchez District, along with the Sea Islands of South Carolina and Georgia, pioneered cotton agriculture in the United States. Until new hybridized breeds of short-staple cotton were created in the early nineteenth century, it was unprofitable to grow cotton in the United States anywhere other than those two areas. Although South Carolina had dominated the cotton plantation culture in the eighteenth century and early in the Antebellum South, it was the Natchez District which first experimented with hybridization, making the cotton boom possible. Historians attribute the major part of the expansion of cotton in the Deep South to Eli Whitney's development of the cotton gin; it lowered processing costs for short-staple cotton, making this profitable for cultivation. It was the kind of cotton that could be grown on uplands and throughout the Black Belt of the Deep South. Development of cotton plantations expanded rapidly, increasing demand for slaves in the South. They were sold in the domestic slave trade chiefly from the Upper South.

The growth of the cotton industry attracted many new white settlers to Mississippi, who competed with the Choctaw for their land. Despite land cessions, the settlers continued to encroach on Choctaw territory, leading to conflict. With the election of President Andrew Jackson in 1828, he pressed for Indian removal, gaining Congressional passage of an act authorizing that in 1830. Starting with the Choctaw, the government began removal of Southeastern Indians in 1831 to lands west of the Mississippi River in Indian Territory. Nearly 15,000 Choctaw left their traditional homeland over the next two years.

The terrain around Natchez on the Mississippi side of the river is hilly. The city sits on a high bluff above the Mississippi River; to reach the riverbank, one must travel down a steep road to the landing called Silver Street, which is in marked contrast to the flat "delta" lowland found across the river surrounding the city of Vidalia, Louisiana. Its early planter elite built numerous antebellum mansions and estates. Many owned plantations in Louisiana but chose to locate their homes on the higher ground in Mississippi. Prior to the Civil War, Natchez had more millionaires than any other city in the United States. It was frequented by notables such as Aaron Burr, Henry Clay, Andrew Jackson, Zachary Taylor, Ulysses S. Grant, Jefferson Davis, Winfield Scott, and John James Audubon. Today the city boasts that it has more antebellum homes than any other city in the U.S., as during the Civil War Natchez was spared the destruction of many other Southern cities.

The Forks of the Road Market had the highest volume of slave sales in Natchez, and Natchez had the most active slave trading market in Mississippi. This also stimulated the city's wealth. The market, at the intersection of Liberty Street and what was then Washington Street, became especially important after the slave traders Isaac Franklin of Tennessee and John Armfield of Virginia purchased the land in 1823. Tens of thousands of  slaves passed through the market, transported from Virginia and the Upper South (many by walking overland), and destined for the plantations in the Deep South.  In this forced migration, more than one million enslaved Black American were taken from their families and moved southward. All trading at the market ceased by the summer of 1863, when Union troops occupied Natchez.

Prior to 1845 and the founding of the Natchez Institute, the city's elite residents were the only ones who could afford a formal education for their children. Although many parents did not have much schooling themselves, they were anxious to provide their children with a quality education. Schools opened in the city as early as 1801, but many of the wealthiest families continued to rely on private tutors or out-of-state institutions, some sending their children as far as England and Scotland. The city founded the Natchez Institute to offer free education to the rest of the white residents. Although children from a variety of economic backgrounds could obtain an education, class differences persisted among students, particularly in terms of school choice and social ties. Although it was considered illegal, black slave children were often taught the alphabet and reading the Bible by their white playmates in private homes.

Natchez also has a very unique history as being a region with a substantial number of free persons of color during the era of slavery. Census records from 1850 and 1860 show that about 85% of the free people of color in the antebellum era were mulattoes; the offspring of white male planter fathers and enslaved or emancipates black females to whom the former freed. Mixed raced free people of color in Natchez acquired wealth in several ways. Very often their planter white male fathers gave them inheritances or their half family members set them up in business. Some of the leading free people of color within the Natchez community include such figures as William Johnson, Robert W. Fitzhugh, William McCary and Louis Winston. Robert H. Wood, was another prominent free person of color. He became the mayor of Natchez which was the exact same position his white planter father Robert Wood occupied years earlier. It was initially believed in post modern times that free people of color lacked a lot of citizen rights regardless of their status. Research in recent decades through courthouse and governmental records has substantially demonstrated that to be untrue for the wealthy property owning free people of color. Owning wealth and being included as equals by the richest of the white families in the antebellum era gave the few people of color who had this circumstance a rare amount of prestige and power. William Johnson, a well known free person of color strives to be recognized as a planter by Natchez society; Archie P Williams a free person of color who was also of Natchez MS was recognized in society as a planter due to being the son of David Percy Williams of Natchez and inheriting a large portion of his wealth. Archie P Williams white side of his family lineage had been established as one of the wealthiest in the region for several generations prior beginning in the 1760s with his great grandfather David Williams. Archie P Williams was one of a few millionaires (especially mixed -race or black millionaires) in the 1800s due to his inherited share of the multi million dollar estate of Winthrop Sargent who was a stepfather to his grandfather Other free persons of color in Natchez acquired skills as artisans, mechanics, shoemakers, etc and they lived a merely comfortable existence in contrast to the enslaved African Americans. Some of the descendants of free persons of color from the antebellum era continue to proper in the Natchez, Mississippi region. The descendants of Robert Wood own the Mackel Funeral Home. Anton R. Williams of Kalamazoo and Grand Rapids, Michigan inherited wealth as a descendant of Archie P. Williams and continues to operate various oil and gas, real estate and timber land business ownership interest in Natchez, Mississippi and the surrounding region from his headquarters of Grand Rapids, Michigan and Kalamazoo, Michigan.

American Civil War (1861–1865)

During the Civil War, Natchez remained largely undamaged. The city surrendered to Flag-Officer David G. Farragut after the fall of New Orleans in May 1862. Two civilians, an elderly man and an eight-year-old girl named Rosalie Beekman, were killed when a Union ironclad shelled the town from the River. The man died of a heart attack and Rosalie was killed by a shell fragment. Union troops under Ulysses S. Grant occupied Natchez in 1863; Grant set up his temporary headquarters in the Natchez mansion Rosalie.

Some Natchez residents remained defiant of the Federal authorities. In 1864, William Henry Elder, the Catholic bishop of the Diocese of Natchez, refused to obey a Federal order to compel his parishioners to pray for the President of the United States. U.S. officials arrested Elder, jailed him briefly, and banished him across the river to Confederate-held Vidalia. Elder was eventually allowed to return to Natchez and resume his clerical duties there. He served until 1880, when he was elevated to Archbishop of Cincinnati.

Ellen Shields's memoir reveals a Southern woman's reactions to Yankee military occupation of the city. Shields' memoir portrays the upheaval of Southern society during the war. Because Southern men were absent at war, many elite women had to exercise their class-based femininity and sexual appeal to deal with the Yankees.

In 1860, there were planters in the Natchez region that were not all of these were enthusiastic Confederates. The exceptions tended to be fairly recent arrivals to the South, men who opposed secession, and some who held social and economic ties to the North. These planters lacked a strong emotional attachment to the South; but when war came, many of their sons and nephews joined the Confederate army anyway. Charles Dahlgren was among the recent migrants; from Philadelphia, he had made his fortune before the war. He did support the Confederacy and led a brigade, but was criticized for failing to defend the Gulf Coast. When the Yankees came, he moved to Georgia for the duration of the war. He returned in 1865 but never recouped his fortune. He had to declare bankruptcy, and in 1870 he gave up and moved to New York City.

Following the Union victory at the Battle of Vicksburg in July, 1863, many refugees, including former slaves, freed by the Emancipation Proclamation, began moving into Natchez and the surrounding countryside. The Union Army officers claimed to be short on resources and unable to provide for the refugees. The Army planned to address the situation with a mixture of paid labor for freed slaves on government leased plantations, the enlistment of able bodied males who were willing to fight in the Union Army and the establishment of refugee camps where former slaves could be provided with education. However, as the war continued, the plan was never effectively implemented and the leased plantations were poorly managed and frequently raided by Confederate troops who controlled the surrounding territory. Hundreds of people living in Natchez during this period, including many former slaves and refugees, died of hunger, disease or were killed in the fighting during this period.

White Natchez residents became much more pro-Confederate 'after' the war. The Lost Cause myth arose as a means for coming to terms with the South's defeat. It quickly became a definitive ideology, strengthened by celebratory activities, speeches, clubs, and statues. The major organizations dedicated to creating and maintaining the tradition were the United Daughters of the Confederacy and United Confederate Veterans. In Natchez and other cities, although the local newspapers and war veterans played a role in the maintenance of the Lost Cause, elite white women were particularly important—especially in establishing cemeteries and memorials, such as the Civil War monument dedicated on Memorial Day 1890. The Lost Cause enabled (white) noncombatants to lay a claim to the watershed event in the reshaping of Southern history.

Postwar period (1865–1900)

Natchez made a rapid economic comeback in the postwar years, with the resumption of much of the commercial shipping traffic on the Mississippi River. The cash crop was still cotton, but gang agricultural slave labor came to be largely replaced by sharecropping, in which freedmen felt they had some independence. In many families, women left field labor to care for their own people. During hard times, they might work for their family and later had to take up domestic service.

In addition to cotton, the development of local industries such as logging added to the exports through the city's wharf. In return, Natchez saw an influx of manufactured goods from northern markets such as Cincinnati, Pittsburgh, and St. Louis.

The city's prominent place in Mississippi River commerce during the nineteenth century was reflected by the naming of nine steamboats Natchez, which traveled the lower river between 1823 and 1918. Many were built for and commanded by the famous Captain Thomas P. Leathers, whom Jefferson Davis had wanted to head the Confederate defense fleet on the Mississippi River. (This appointment never was concluded.) In 1885, the Anchor Line, known for its luxury steamboats operating between St. Louis and New Orleans, launched its "brag boat", the City of Natchez. This ship operated for a year before being lost to a fire at Cairo, Illinois, on 28 December 1886. Since 1975, an excursion steamboat at New Orleans has borne the name Natchez.

Such river commerce sustained the city's economic growth until just after the turn of the twentieth century, when steamboat traffic began to be replaced by the railroads. The city's economy declined over the course of the 20th century, as did that of many Mississippi River towns bypassed by railroad traffic. Tourism has helped to compensate for the decline.

After the war and during Reconstruction, the world of domestic servants in Natchez changed somewhat in response to emancipation and freedom. After the Civil War, most domestic servants continued to be black women. Often, the women were supporting children; although they were poorly paid, their domestic work produced important income for family maintenance. White employers often continued the paternalism that had characterized relations between slaveholders and slaves. They often preferred black workers to white servants. White men and women who worked as domestics generally held positions such as gardener or governess, while black servants worked as cooks, maids, and laundresses. 

In 1871, Natchez opened its first co-educational public school (K-12) for African American students, the Union School.

Since 1900

For a short time, the women's school Stanton College in Natchez educated daughters of the white elite. It was located in Stanton Hall, built as a private mansion in 1858.  During the early 20th century, the college was a site of negotiation, as daughters of the traditional planter class encountered those of the new commercial elite. Other interplay took place between traditional parents and their more modern daughters. The young women joined social clubs and literary societies, which helped to maintain relations among cousins and family friends. The coursework included classes in proper behavior and letter writing, as well as skills that might enable those suffering from genteel poverty to make a living. The girls often balked at dress codes and rules, but also replicated their parents' social values. Stanton Hall was designated as a National Historic Landmark in the late 20th century.

Located on the Mississippi River, the town long had an active nightlife, featuring jazz and blues created and played by Black American musicians. On April 23, 1940, 209 people died in a fire at the Rhythm Night Club, a black dance hall in Natchez. The local paper remarked that "203 black bought 50 cent tickets to eternity." This fire has been noted as the fourth-deadliest fire in U.S. history. Several blues songs pay tribute to this tragedy and mention the city of Natchez.

Industrial companies were located in Natchez in the 1960s, bringing jobs that were important to the city. Among them was Armstrong Tire and Rubber company. Such companies tended to repeat the pattern of segregation, keeping African Americans confined to lower-level jobs. The National Association for the Advancement of Colored People (NAACP) encouraged them to end such restrictions.

Civil Rights Era

In the early 1960s, as the civil rights movement gained some successes and James Meredith was admitted as the first black to the University of Mississippi, Natchez was the center of Ku Klux Klan activity opposing integration and the movement. E. L. McDaniel, the Grand Dragon of the United Klans of America, the largest Klan organization in 1965, had his office in Natchez at 114 Main Street. In August 1964, McDaniel established a klavern of the UKA in Natchez, operating under the cover name of the Adams County Civic and Betterment Association.

Despite the violence, Forrest A. Johnson, Sr., a well-respected white attorney in Natchez, began to speak out and write against the Klan. From 1964 through 1965, he published an alternative newspaper called the Miss-Lou Observer, in which he weekly took on the Klan. Klansmen and their supporters conducted an economic boycott against his law practice, nearly ruining him financially.

In his October 1964 report, A.E. Hopkins, an investigator for the Mississippi State Sovereignty Commission, a tax-supported organization that sponsored surveillance of residents, wrote that the Federal Bureau of Investigation (FBI) was in Adams County in force

because of the alleged burning of several churches in that area as well as several bombings and the whipping of several Negroes; also, because of the murder of two Negroes from Meadville whose bodies were recovered from the Mississippi river while the murders of three civil rights workers from Philadelphia was being investigated by Federal, State and local officials.Note: Hopkins was referring to the murders of the 19-year-old black men Henry Hezekiah Dee and Charles Henry Moore of Franklin County, Mississippi.

By that time, more than 100 FBI agents were in the area as part of the Philadelphia investigation; three civil rights workers had disappeared and that summer were found murdered and buried in an earthen dam.

The FBI was also trying to keep racial violence under control. Bill Williams, an FBI agent in Natchez for two years during that time, said in a 2005 interview that the "race wars in the area are 'a story never told.' He said that Natchez in 1964 had become the 'focal point for racial, anti-civil rights activity for the state for the next several years'."

Murders of four other African-American men in this area in 1964 are attributed to Klan members. Other Klan murders of activists followed in succeeding years, despite or in resistance to Congressional passage of civil rights legislation.

As Klan violence rose in the 1960s, African Americans organized an armed paramilitary group called the Deacons for Defense and Justice, borrowing from a Louisiana group. They began to accompany NAACP officers and protesters and carried weapons openly under Mississippi law.

George Metcalf and Wharlest Jackson Sr. both worked for the Armstrong Tire and Rubber Plant, where they tried to open more positions to African Americans. They were both active in the Natchez chapter of the NAACP: Metcalf as president and Jackson as treasurer. On February 27, 1967, Jackson was killed when a car bomb went off in his truck as he drove home from work. He had recently received a raise and promotion to a position previously "reserved" for whites. A Korean War veteran, he was married with five children. His murder was never solved, and no one has been charged in the crime.

In August 1967, Metcalf submitted a petition in favor of school integration to the school board. (The Supreme Court had ruled segregated public schools as unconstitutional in 1954.) He asked the board not to publish the names of signatories to the petition, but they released the list. Little more than a week later, Metcalf was seriously injured in a car bombing. It was never solved.

In response to these attacks, the Natchez Deacons for Defense stepped up their visible presence. All the men were already members of the NAACP and well known to each other. They maintained secrecy about the group, evading investigation by the Mississippi Sovereignty Commission and others. This group was important in the community; its members and numbers were kept secret, but they created a defense and warning against violent attacks of blacks. In addition to protecting activists, the Deacons helped enforce initiatives of the civil rights movement, such as a commercial boycott of white-owned stores in a successful effort to win concessions in integration from retailers and the city. Chapters of the Deacons were organized in other Mississippi areas.

In 1966, the House Un-American Activities Committee published the names of Natchez residents who were current or former members of the Klan, including more than 70 employees at the International Paper plant in the city, as well as members of the Natchez police and the Adams County Sheriff's departments. HUAC found that at least four white supremacist terrorist groups were operating in Natchez during the 1960s, including the Mississippi White Caps. The MWC distributed flyers anonymously around the city, threatening "crooks and mongrelizers." The Americans for the Preservation of the White Race was founded in May 1963 by nine residents of Natchez.

The Cottonmouth Moccasin Gang was founded by Claude Fuller and Natchez Klansmen Ernest Avants and James Lloyd Jones. In June 1966, they murdered Natchez resident Ben Chester White, reportedly as part of a plot to draw Dr. Martin Luther King Jr. to Natchez in order to assassinate him. The three Klansmen were arrested and charged by the state with the murder. In each case, despite overwhelming evidence and, in Jones' case, a confession, either the charges were dismissed or the defendants were acquitted by all-white juries. Blacks had been excluded from juries for decades as they had been disenfranchised since 1890 by a new state constitution and unable to vote. By 1966 the Voting Rights Act had been passed, but courts used other means to exclude them from juries; while many blacks were still registering to vote.

Prosecution of civil rights cold cases
James Ford Seale, one of two men arrested in November 1964 as a suspect in the kidnapping and murders of Henry Hezekiah Dee and Charles Henry Moore, was released when the state district attorney decided evidence was insufficient. Interest in the case was revived after 2000, when FBI files from 1964 were recovered by journalists. The FBI re-opened the investigation. Seale was arrested and charged by the US Attorney. He was tried and convicted in federal court in 2007. He died in federal prison in 2011 at the age of 76.

The FBI discovered that 67-year-old Ben Chester White, murdered in June 1966, had been killed on federal land near Pretty Creek in the Homochitto National Forest of Natchez. As a result, they could establish federal jurisdiction to investigate and prosecute this case. In 1999, the case was reopened. Authorities indicted Ernest Avants in 2000 for the murder. He was convicted in 2003 and sentenced to life in prison; he died the following year at the age of seventy-two.

In February 2011, The Injustice Files of the Investigation Discovery channel aired three TV episodes of cold case murders related to the civil rights era. The first episode was devoted to the murder of Wharlest Jackson Sr., killed in 1967, as noted above. This was part of a collaboration with the FBI, which had started an initiative in 2007 to investigate and prosecute civil rights cases.

Natural disasters

On May 7, 1840, an intense tornado struck Natchez, killing 269 people, most of whom were on flatboats in the Mississippi River. The tornado killed 317 people in all, making it the second-deadliest tornado in United States history.

In August 2005, in the aftermath of Hurricane Katrina, Natchez served as a refuge for coastal Mississippi and Louisiana residents, providing shelters, hotel rooms, rentals, Federal Emergency Management Agency disbursements and animal shelters. Natchez was able to keep fuel supplies open for the duration of the disaster, provide essential power to the most affected areas, receive food deliveries, and maintain law and order while assisting visitors from other areas. Many churches, including Parkway Baptist Church, were used as emergency shelters.  In the months after the hurricane, a majority of the available homes were purchased or rented, with some tenants making Natchez their permanent home.

Images and memory

Prominent families in Natchez have used the Natchez Pilgrimage, an annual tour of the antebellum mansions, to portray a nostalgic vision of its antebellum slaveholding society. Since the Civil Rights Movement, however, this version has been increasingly challenged by blacks who have sought to add the black experience in Natchez to its public history. According to the author Paul Hendrickson, "Blacks are not a part of the Natchez Pilgrimage."

By the winter of 1988, the National Park Service established Natchez National Historical Park around Melrose mansion. The William Johnson House in the city was added a few years later. The tours given by the N.P.S. tend to present a more complex view of the past by including African-American history. In 2021, Forks of the Road Market, which at one time was the second largest slave-trading site in the United States was added to the National Historical Park.

The historic district has been used by Hollywood as the backdrop for feature films set in the antebellum period. Disney's The Adventures of Huck Finn was partially filmed here in 1993. The 1982 television movie Rascals and Robbers: The Adventures of Tom Sawyer and Huck Finn was also filmed here. The television mini-series Beulah Land was filmed in Natchez, as well a number of individual weekly shows of the TV drama The Mississippi, starring Ralph Waite. Parts of the television mini-series North and South were filmed in Natchez and neighboring Washington. Also, John Wayne's The Horse Soldiers was filmed in and around Natchez.

In 2007, a United States Courthouse was opened, after renovating a historic hall for changed use. Part of the old hall had a Jim Crow-era monument to the local men and women from Natchez and Adams County who served in World War I. The 1924 monument was the subject of several stories in the Natchez Democrat, as reporters noted it lacked representation of black Army troops who had served in the war. A 2010 article suggested updating the monument to reflect all the local troops, and retiring the old monument.  On November 10, 2011, new plaques were installed that include the names of 592 African-American soldiers and 107 white soldiers, none of whom had been listed on the old plaques.

A cinema verité account of the 1960s Civil Rights Movement in Natchez was depicted by the filmmaker Ed Pincus in his film Black Natchez (2010). The film highlights organizing of the black community in 1965–1967. A black leader has been car-bombed and a struggle ensues in the black community for control. A group of black men organize a chapter of the Deacons for Defense. The community splits between more conservative and activist elements.

A Museum of African American History and Culture has been opened in Natchez.

References

Further reading
 Anderson, Aaron D. Builders of a New South: Merchants, Capital, and the Remaking of Natchez, 1865-1914. (University Press of Mississippi, 2013).
 Boler, Jaime Elizabeth. City under Siege: Resistance and Power in Natchez, Mississippi, 1719–1857, PhD. U. of Southern Mississippi, Dissertation Abstracts International 2006 67(3): 1061-A. DA3209667, 393p.
 Brazy, Martha Jane. An American Planter: Stephen Duncan of Antebellum Natchez and New York, Louisiana State U. Press, 2006. 232 pp.
 Broussard, Joyce L. "Occupied Natchez, Elite Women, and the Feminization of the Civil War," Journal of Mississippi History, 2008 70(2): 179–207.
 Broussard, Joyce L. Stepping Lively in Place: The Not-Married, Free Women of Civil War-Era Natchez, Mississippi. (U of Georgia Press, 2016).
 Cox, James L. The Mississippi Almanac. New York: Computer Search & Research, 2001. .
 Davis, Jack E. Race Against Time: Culture and Separation in Natchez Since 1930, (LSU Press, 2001).
 Davis, Ronald L. F. Good and Faithful Labor: from Slavery to Sharecropping in the Natchez District 1860-1890, (Greenwood Press, 1982).
 Dittmer, John. Local People: The Civil Rights Movement in Mississippi. (U of Illinois Press, 1994).
 Dolensky, Suzanne T. "Natchez in 1920: On the Threshold of Modernity."  Journal of Mississippi History 73#2 (2011): 95-137 online 
 Gandy, Thomas H. and Evelyn. The Mississippi Steamboat Era in Historic Photographs: Natchez to New Orleans, 1870–1920. New York: Dover Publications, 1987.
 Gower, Herschel. Charles Dahlgren of Natchez: The Civil War and Dynastic Decline Brassey's, 2002. 293 pp.
 Inglis, G. Douglas. "Searching for Free People of Color in Colonial Natchez," Southern Quarterly 2006 43(2): 97–112
 James, Dorris Clayton. Ante-Bellum Natchez (1968), the standard scholarly study
 Libby, David J. Slavery and Frontier Mississippi, 1720–1835, U. Press of Mississippi, 2004. 163 pp. focus on Natchez
 Nguyen, Julia Huston. "Useful and Ornamental: Female Education in Antebellum Natchez," Journal of Mississippi History 2005 67(4): 291–309
 Nolan,  Charles E. St. Mary's of Natchez: The History of a Southern Catholic Congregation, 1716–1988 (2 vol 1992)
 Umoja, Akinyele Omowale. "'We Will Shoot Back': The Natchez Model and Paramilitary Organization in the Mississippi Freedom Movement", Journal of Black Studies, Vol. 32, No. 3 (Jan., 2002), pp. 271–294. In JSTOR
 Way, Frederick. Way's Packet Dictionary, 1848–1994: Passenger Steamboats of the Mississippi River System Since the Advent of Photography in Mid-Continent America. 2nd ed. Athens, OH: Ohio University Press, 1994.
 Wayne, Michael.  The Reshaping of Plantation Society: The Natchez District, 1860–1880 (1983).

External links

 Items related to Natchez, Mississippi, various dates (via Digital Public Library of America).
 Materials related to Natchez, Mississippi, various dates (via Library of Congress, Prints & Photos Division)
 F.O.R. Natchez!, Friends of Our Riverfront

Natchez, Mississippi
natchez